Lucy Allan or Lucy Allen may refer to:

 Lucy Allan (politician) (born 1964), British Conservative Party Member of Parliament (MP) for Telford since 2015
 Lucy Allan (producer) (born 1978), British television producer
 Lucy T. Allen (born 1941), former Democratic member of the North Carolina General Assembly
 Lucy Grace Allen, American cookery teacher and author
 Lucy Allen Smart (1877–1960), American librarian and curator